The 2018 season was Lillestrøm's 43rd consecutive, and final, year in Eliteserien. Lillestrøm finished the season in 14th position, entering the Relegation play-offs where they were defeated on away goals by IK Start after the two-legged affair ended 5-5. In the Norwegian Cup, Lillestrøm reached the Third Round before defeat to Strømmen.

Squad

Out on loan

Transfers

Winter

In:

Out:

Summer

In:

Out:

Competitions

Eliteserien

Results summary

Results by round

Results

Table

Relegation play-offs

Norwegian Cup

Squad statistics

Appearances and goals

|-
|colspan="14"|Players away from Lillestrøm on loan:

|-
|colspan="14"|Players who left Lillestrøm during the season:

|}

Goal scorers

Clean sheets

Disciplinary record

References

Lillestrøm SK seasons
Lillestrom